Onur Içli (born 8 January 1982) is a Turkish former football forward.

Career
İçli started his career at Gaziantep Büyükşehir Belediyespor. In 2003-04 season he joined The Süper Lig club Gaziantepspor and in the first half of the season, played 3 matches as a substitute and scored a goal against Bursaspor. In the second part of the season, he was loaned to Kayseri Erciyesspor in the TFF First League. There, he suffered an injury in his first game for the new team. In 2005-06 season he signed again for a Süper Lig team Denizlispor, but spent most of the time being loaned to lower division teams like Istanbulspor, Kahramanmarasspor and Bilecikspor.
In April 2009, he joined Dandenong Thunder in the Victorian Premier League. Not having the best of seasons at Dandenong Thunder, he moved to Southern Stars FC in the June transfer window of 2009.

References

Living people
1982 births
Turkish footballers
Süper Lig players
Association football forwards
Gaziantepspor footballers
Dandenong Thunder SC players
Kayseri Erciyesspor footballers
Denizlispor footballers